Huddersfield Town's 1980–81 campaign was very successful following on from the previous season's brilliant promotion from the Fourth Division. The team just missed out on earning back-to-back promotions, by finishing in 4th place, just 3 points behind 3rd-placed Charlton Athletic.

Squad at the start of the season

Review
Following the successful promotion campaign from Division Four, many fans were hoping for a quick return to Division Two. After a shaky start, in which it took Town 5 games to win a match, but they started a charge up the Division 3 table, with a run of 5 straight wins between 30 September and mid-October. Then followed a mid-period of mediocrity, which led onto a run of 12 matches unbeaten including a win against Barnsley, watched by nearly 30,000 people.

After losing two games on the trot to Reading and Swindon Town, they went on a run of 6 matches unbeaten which included a 5–0 win against Exeter City. They then lost against Millwall, Burnley and Hull City ended Town's promotion hopes, despite beating both Portsmouth and Fulham at the end of the season to finish in 4th place.

Squad at the end of the season

Results

Division Three

FA Cup

Football League Cup

Appearances and goals

1980-81
English football clubs 1980–81 season